Rhopalus subrufus is a species of scentless plant bugs belonging to the family Rhopalidae, subfamily Rhopalinae.  It is found in most of Europe, but not Ireland and northern Scandinavia.

Description
It can be distinguished for its membranous forewings and the connexivum with dark and light stripes.

It mainly feeds on Hypericum species, but also on many other plants.

References

External links
Biolib
British Bugs

Hemiptera of Europe
Insects described in 1790
Taxa named by Johann Friedrich Gmelin
Rhopalini